The table contains a comparison of karate styles. Some of the distinguishing features are listed, such as lineage, general form of stances, the balance of hard and soft techniques, and the number and names of kata forms.

Background
The four major karate styles developed in Japan, especially in Okinawa are Shotokan, Wado-ryu, Shito-ryu, and Goju-ryu; many other styles of Karate are derived from these four. The first three of these styles find their origins in the Shorin-Ryu style from Shuri, Okinawa, while Goju-ryu finds its origins in Naha. Shuri karate is rather different from Naha karate, drawing on different predecessor influences. Shito-ryu can be regarded as a blend of Shuri and Naha traditions as its kata incorporate both Shuri and Naha kata.

The formal application within the four major karate styles are as follows:

 Shotokan involves long, deep stances and powerful long range techniques. 
 Shito-ryu, on the other hand, uses more upright stances and stresses speed rather than power in its long and middle range techniques. 
 Wado-ryu too employs shorter, more natural stances and the style is characterised by the emphasis on body shifting to avoid attacks. 
 Goju-ryu places emphasis on Sanchin kata and its rooted Sanchin stance, and it features grappling and close-range techniques.

Some later styles of karate have been derived from blending techniques from the four main branches, while others have added techniques from other martial arts. For example Kyokushin, which is an extremely hard style derived from Shotokan and Gōjū-ryū, involves much more breaking and full contact, knockdown sparring as a main part of training.

Comparison of styles

See also

Boxing styles and technique
Hybrid martial arts
Styles of Chinese martial arts
Styles of wrestling
Comparison of kobudō styles
Karate kata—includes comparison of kata performed by style

References

Sources 
 Karate-do Kyohan, written by Gichin Funakoshi, translated by Tsutomu Oshima (1935).

External links 
 Karate, Okinawan Kobudo and Kendo Kata videos
 Karate styles

Karate styles
Karate
Style